The US Yachts US 27 is an American sailboat that was designed by Doug Peterson and Daryl Watson as a  racer-cruiser and first built in 1983.

The design is a unauthorized development of Peterson's International Offshore Rule Half Ton class Chaser 29 racer, using the same hull design with a different deck and other changes. The US 27 molds were later sold to Pearson Yachts and developed into the Triton 27 in 1984.

Production
The design was built by US Yachts in the United States, starting in 1983, but it is now out of production.

Design
The US 27 is a recreational keelboat, built predominantly of fiberglass, with wood trim. It has a masthead sloop rig, a raked stem, a reverse transom, an internally mounted spade-type rudder controlled by a tiller and a fixed fin keel or optional shoal draft keel. It displaces  and carries  of ballast.

The boat is optionally fitted with a Swedish Volvo diesel engine for docking and maneuvering.

The design has sleeping accommodation for four people, with a double "V"-berth in the bow cabin, a "U"-shaped settee and drop-down dinette table in the main cabin on the port side. The galley is located on the starboard side amidships and is equipped with a two-burner stove, ice box and a sink. The enclosed head is located just aft of the bow cabin on the port side.

See also
List of sailing boat types

References

Keelboats
1980s sailboat type designs
Sailing yachts
Sailboat type designs by Doug Peterson
Sailboat type designs by Daryl Watson
Sailboat types built by US Yachts